Sanjay Mishra  is an Indian American musician who began performing after completing his studies at the Peabody Conservatory of Music. Mishra plays with an eclecticism well suited to his multicultural background combining both Eastern and Western influences. He has been quoted saying, "I come from a tradition that has a lot of improvisation. Sometimes Western classical music can seem a little rigid, I had to find some middle ground."

Education
He graduated from the Peabody Conservatory of Music, Johns Hopkins University in 1987.

Early career
Mishra first came to public acclaim for his album Blue Incantation with guitarist Jerry Garcia of The Grateful Dead. It is one of Garcia's last works. Tributes to Garcia's work occur in Mishra's concerts.

Present and future
His album Chateau Benares (October 2006) with guest appearances by DJ Logic and Keller Williams, among others, was received with rave reviews on National Public Radio and in The Washington Post.

He has also composed music for films. His score for the French film Port Djema was presented The Lifetime Vision Award at the Hamptons Film Festival in New York and described as "hauntingly beautiful". The film won The Golden Bear at The Berlin Film Festival in 1996.

Mishra primarily records on Akar Music, distributed by City Hall Records in San Rafael, CA. His music has also been released on PolyGram, Philips, EMI Records, Mercury, Ryko, Putumayo, Melodia and other labels. He is author of Guitar Atlas: India, published by Alfred enhanced by Sanjay's "intimate knowledge of the relationship between Indian music and the guitar".

He taught audio production at The Georgetown University in Washington, D.C from from 2006-2011

Discography

Albums
The Crossing (1993)
Blue Incantation (1995) – with Jerry Garcia
Port Djema (1997) – soundtrack
Rescue (2000) – with Dennis Chambers and Samir Chatterjee
Chateau Benares (2006)
Lamplighter (2014)
 Duets (2020) - with Garrett Gleason

Compilations
Music From the Tea Lands (2000) Putumayo World
Deep Orient, Vol. 2 (2001) Melodia (France)
Indian Spirit – 3 (2009) EMI Records

Guest appearances
Trusty – Goodbye, Dr. Fate (1995)
Dream (2007)

Publishing
Guitar Atlas: India published by Alfred Publishing

References

External links
Official Site
Sanjay talks with NPR about his CD and book
Sanjay on LastFM
Rolling Stone magazine feature on Sanjay

American acoustic guitarists
Living people
Indian emigrants to the United States
American male musicians of Indian descent
American musicians of Indian descent
Peabody Institute alumni
Musicians from Kolkata
American male guitarists
Year of birth missing (living people)
People from Kolkata
Johns Hopkins University alumni
Indian people of French descent
American people of French descent